Darko Mađarovski (born 17 June 1983) is a Serbian former professional tennis player.

Junior tennis
Born in Belgrade, Mađarovski was ranked as high as three for doubles on the ITF junior circuit, winning the Osaka Mayor's Cup and finishing runner-up in the Orange Bowl, both with regular junior partner Janko Tipsarević.

Professional tour
Mađarovski had a best singles ranking of 332 on the professional tour and won five Futures titles, one of which was won over Juan Martín del Potro in the final. In 2002 he made a Davis Cup appearance for Yugoslavia in the doubles against South Africa, partnering Dušan Vemić. He earned a doubles silver medal at the 2005 Universiade and was a doubles finalist in three ATP Challenger tournaments. His only ATP Tour main draw appearance came at the 2009 Serbia Open, where he and Marko Djokovic upset the number one seeds Daniel Nestor and Nenad Zimonjić in the first round.

See also
List of Serbia Davis Cup team representatives

References

External links
 
 
 

1983 births
Living people
Serbian male tennis players
Serbia and Montenegro male tennis players
Medalists at the 2005 Summer Universiade
Universiade silver medalists for Serbia and Montenegro
Universiade medalists in tennis
Tennis players from Belgrade